Alanah Woody (March 24, 1956 – July 19, 2007) was an American archeologist, anthropologist, professor and executive director of the Nevada Rock Art Foundation. She was considered an expert in Native American rock art, such as pictographs and petroglyphs, especially in Nevada, and championed their protection.

References

External links
Nevada Rock Art Foundation

Rock art in North America
American women anthropologists
1956 births
2007 deaths
20th-century American women scientists
20th-century American scientists
20th-century American anthropologists
21st-century American women